Zdenko Kaprálik (born 28 August 1985) is a Slovak professional footballer.

Career
Born in Dolný Kubín, Kaprálik has played for Inter Bratislava, FC Zwolle, SC Cambuur and FC Spartak Trnava.

External links
 Voetbal International

1985 births
Living people
People from Dolný Kubín
Sportspeople from the Žilina Region
Slovak footballers
FK Inter Bratislava players
PEC Zwolle players
SC Cambuur players
FC Spartak Trnava players
TOP Oss players
Czech First League players
FC Baník Ostrava players
Association football defenders
Slovak Super Liga players
Eerste Divisie players
Slovak expatriate footballers
Expatriate footballers in the Netherlands
Slovak expatriate sportspeople in the Netherlands
Expatriate footballers in the Czech Republic
Expatriate footballers in Thailand
Zdenko Kapralik